Truls Aronsen Wickholm (born 15 October 1978) is a Norwegian politician for the Labour Party.

He served as a deputy representative to the Parliament of Norway from Oslo during the terms 2005–2009, 2009–2013 and 2013–2017. He became a full member of Parliament in 2005, when Jens Stoltenberg became Prime Minister; then continued from 2009, now as the deputy of Jonas Gahr Støre. He remained MP until October 2013, when the Stoltenberg's Second Cabinet lost office.

References

1978 births
Living people
Politicians from Oslo
Labour Party (Norway) politicians
Members of the Storting
21st-century Norwegian politicians